A Bachelor of Software Engineering Honours [BSE(Hons.)] is an undergraduate academic degree (Bachelor's Degree) awarded for completing a program of study in the field of software development for computers in information technology.

"Software Engineering is the systematic development and application of techniques which lead to the creation of correct and reliable computer software."

Topics covered 
In following years a software engineering student will often have a much stronger focus on Software systems and data management. The inclusion of human factors in a software engineering degree has been heavily debated, arguing that products of software engineers often are too difficult to use by consumers.

Sample B.S. in Software Engineering Degree Information from the University of Virginia - Wise
Core SWE Requirements:

 Introduction to Software Engineering
 Software Requirements & Modeling
 Software Design & Construction
 Software Testing, Verification, and Validation
 Software Quality Assurance
 Software Project Management
 Software Configuration Management

CS Requirements:

 Fundamentals of Programming
 Data Structures
 Introduction to Algorithms
 Operating Systems
 Computer Architecture
 Programming Languages
 Human - Computer Interaction
 Discrete Mathematics
 Database Designing

Math Requirements:

 Probability & Statistics
 Calculus I
 Calculus II
 Calculus III
 Linear Algebra
Boolean Algebra

General skills acquired through a Bachelor's degree course in Software Engineering
Employers generally seek applicants with strong programming, systems analysis and business skills.

"A large difference exists between the software engineering skills taught at a typical
university or college and the skills that are desired of a software engineer by a typical
software development organization. At the heart of this difference seems to be the way
software engineering is typically introduced to students: general theory is presented in a
series of lectures and put into (limited) practice in an associated class project."

Graduate prospects
Graduate prospects are projected to be excellent with the amount of software engineers in the industry estimated to rise by roughly 38% from 2006 to 2016, with total real wage in the industry increasing by an estimated 38.2%. The U.S. Bureau of Labor Statistics Occupational Outlook Job Outlook for Software engineers and Developers 2019-29 predicts only a 22% growth. After the crash of the dot-com bubble (1999–2001) and the Great Recession (2008), many U.S. software professions were left without work or with lower wages. In addition, enrollment in computer-related degrees and other STEM degrees (STEM attrition) in the US has been dropping for years, especially for women, which, according to Beaubouef and Mason  could be attributed to a lack of general interest in science and mathematics and also out of an apparent fear that software will be subject to the same pressures as manufacturing and agriculture careers. The U.S. Bureau of Labor Statistics Occupational Outlook 2014-24 predicts a decline for Computer Programmers of -8 percent, then for 2016-26 predicts a decline of -7 percent, then a decline of -9 percent from 2019 to 2029, and finally predicts a decline of -10 percent from 2021 to 2031.

International variations

South Asia 
In  Pakistan and Nepal, Bachelor of Engineering in Software Engineering (BE Software) is an 8-semester course of study. This degree is provided by University of Engineering and Technology, Taxila, 
Virtual University of Pakistan Superior university and many others and  Pokhara University Nepal.

In Bangladesh, this degree is named Bachelor of Science in Software Engineering (BS SE) which is also an 8-semester course of study.  University of Dhaka is the pioneer of Software Engineering education in Bangladesh offering Bachelor of Science in Software Engineering (BSSE) degree since 2009 with 6 months industry internship program.

The Bachelor of Software Engineering degree is awarded to those who successfully complete an eight-semester program.

References

External links 
 U.S. Department of Education's list of recognized institutions offering a degree program in Computer Software Engineering
 Summary of Software Engineering and the roles of software engineers in the industry
 Bachelor of Science in Software Engineering - Information and Communication Technology

Science in Information Technology
Computer science education
Information technology qualifications